Race Wars is a drag racing event in the movie The Fast and the Furious, which describes the underground illegal racing scene in Los Angeles, California, that character Dominic Toretto (Vin Diesel) and his team invent. Race Wars is not mentioned again until they reference it in the seventh installment of the Fast and Furious franchise, Furious 7. The event  consists of drag races where racers compete for large amounts of cash or pink slips, while beautiful women dance around the cars and throughout the event. There is a real life event based on the movie that occurs in multiple places throughout the world, including Australia and Royal City, Washington.

History 
The first Race Wars event located in Royal City, Washington, occurred in May 2013. Over 10,000 people showed, including over 75 cars that entered in the races. The Royal City Lions Club – an organization that has been racing for nearly 10 years by the time of the first Race Wars event – gave out three $1,000 scholarships to students of a local high school located in Royal City. They also donated $1,000 to their local Fire Districts. With the great success of the first Royal City Race Wars, the Lions Club plans for many more Race Wars events to come.

Locations 
Besides occurring in Royal City, Washington, the  event of Race Wars also occurs in Australia, where the automobile scene is very active, and in Eisenach, Germany, where it is called German Racewars. The event is very similar to that in the United States; usually consisting of a small fee to enter into the drag races and an even smaller fee to spectate/park. People do not race for pink slips or large amounts of cash like in the movie, however, as it is just an event where people can test their cars on the strip, see how they match up to other vehicles, and have a good time in a safe environment. In efforts to reduce illegal street racing, this event allows for people to push their cars to the limit in a controlled environment.

References 

Drag racing
Fast & Furious